Vaitarna is a railway station on the Western line of the Mumbai Suburban Railway network.

References 

Railway stations in Palghar district
Mumbai Suburban Railway stations
Mumbai WR railway division